Nicholas Walshe (d. 1568) of Little Sodbury and Olveston, Gloucestershire was an English politician.

Family
He was a younger son of Maurice Walshe of Little Sodbury. In 1556 he survived a fireball that struck the house and killed his father and elder siblings. He married Mary, daughter of Sir John Berkeley of Stoke Gifford. He died in his thirties in 1568, leaving his three-year-old son Henry as heir. His wife subsequently married Sir William Herbert of Swansea, while his son died in a duel.

Career
He was a justice of the peace by 1559, served as sheriff of Gloucestershire in 1561/2 and was chosen as Member (MP) of the Parliament of England for Gloucestershire in 1563.

References

1560s deaths
People from South Gloucestershire District
English MPs 1563–1567